The Flanders Open was a darts tournament that has been held since 2008 until 2010.

List of winners

2008 establishments in the Netherlands
2010 disestablishments in the Netherlands
Darts tournaments